Davidson County Courthouse may refer to:

 Old Davidson County Courthouse (North Carolina), Lexington, North Carolina
 Davidson County Courthouse (Tennessee), Nashville, Tennessee